The 2022–23 Montreal Force season is the first in franchise history. For the regular season, the club will host games throughout the province of Quebec. Ann-Sophie Bettez will serve as the franchise's first-ever captain.

Regular season

News and notes
 November 5: The Force compete in their first game in franchise history. Opposing the Buffalo Beauts, Ann-Sophie Bettez scored in the first period on goaltender Lovisa Berndtsson, resulting in the franchise's first-ever goal.

Standings

Schedule

|- style="background:#ccf;"
| 1 || November 5 || @ Buffalo Beauts || 5–4 || SO || Deguire ||Northtown Center || 1–0–0 || 2 || Ann-Sophie Bettez scores the first goal in franchise historyTricia Deguire records the first shoot-out win in franchise history
|- style="background:#fcc;"
| 2 || November 6 || @ Buffalo Beauts || 2–3 ||  || Deschênes || Northtown Center || 1–1–0 || 2 || Kristina Shanahan and Deziray De Sousa record their first professional goals.
|- style="background:#cfc;"
| 3 || November 26 || Metropolitan Riveters || 5–3 ||  || Deguire || Verdun Auditorium || 2–1–0 || 5 || 
|- style="background:#fcc;"
| 4 || November 27 || Metropolitan Riveters || 2–3 ||  || Deschênes || Arena Raymond Bourque || 2–2–0 || 5 || 
|-

|- style="background:#ccf;"
| 5 || December 3 || Connecticut Whale || 4–3 || SO || Deguire || Arena Conrad Parent || 3–2–0 || 7 || 
|- style="background:#fcc;"
| 6 || December 4 || Connecticut Whale || 2–3 || || Deguire || Arena Conrad Parent || 3–3–0 || 7 || 
|- style="background:#fcc;"
| 7 || December 17 || @ Minnesota Whitecaps || 2–5 || || Deguire || Richfield Ice Arena || 3–4–0 || 7 || 
|- style="background:#cfc;"
| 8 || December 18 || @ Minnesota Whitecaps || 4–1 || || Deschênes || Richfield Ice Arena || 4–4–0 || 10 || 

|- style="background:#fff;"
|9 || January 7 || Toronto Six || 2–3 || OT || Deschênes || Colisee Financiere Sun Life || 4–4–1 || 11 || 
|- style="background:#fcc;"
|10 || January 8 || Toronto Six || 2–3 ||  || Deguire || Colisee Financiere Sun Life || 4–5–1 || 11 || 
|- style="background:#cfc;"
|11 || January 14 || @ Connecticut Whale || 5–4 ||  || Deschênes || UPMC Lemiuex Sports Complex || 5–5–1 || 14 || 
|- style="background:#fcc;"
|12 || January 21 || Boston Pride || 0–5 ||  || Deschênes || Centre Premier Tech || 5–6–1 || 14 || 
|- style="background:#ccf;"
|13 || January 22 || Boston Pride || 2–1 || OT || Deschênes || Centre Premier Tech || 6–6–1 || 16 || 
|- style="background:#fcc;"
|14 || January 27 || @ Connecticut Whale || 1–4 ||  || Deschênes || International Skating Center of CT || 6–7–1 || 16 || 

|- style="background:#;"
| – || February 4 || Minnesota Whitecaps ||  ||  ||  || Arena regional de la Riviere-du-Nord  ||  ||  || Postponed due to inclement weather; rescheduled for February 6.
|- style="background:#fcc;"
| 15 || February 5 || Minnesota Whitecaps || 1–4 ||  || Deguire || Arena regional de la Riviere-du-Nord  || 6–8–1 || 16 || 
|- style="background:#fcc;"
| 16 || February 6 || Minnesota Whitecaps || 2–3 ||  || Deguire || Arena regional de la Riviere-du-Nord  || 6–9–1 || 16 || 
|- style="background:#cfc;"
| 17 || February 11 || @ Toronto Six || 3–0 ||  || Deguire || Canlan Ice Sports – York || 7–9–1 || 19 || 
|- style="background:#fcc;"
| 18 || February 12 || @ Toronto Six || 1–2 ||  || Deguire || Canlan Ice Sports – York || 7–10–1 || 19 || 
|- style="background:#fcc;"
| 19 || February 18 || @ Boston Pride || 1–4 ||  || Deguire || Warrior Ice Arena || 7–11–1 || 19 || 
|- style="background:#fcc;"
| 20 || February 19 || @ Boston Pride || 1–2 ||  || Deguire || Warrior Ice Arena || 7–12–1 || 19 || 
|- style="background:#fcc;"
| 21 || February 25 || Buffalo Beauts || 1–3 ||  || Deguire || Pavillon de la Jeunesse || 7–13–1 || 19 || 
|- style="background:#cfc;"
| 22 || February 26 || Buffalo Beauts || 6–2 ||  || Deguire || Pavillon de la Jeunesse || 8–13–1 || 22 || 

|- style="background:#fff;"
| 23 || March 4 || @ Metropolitan Riveters || 1–2 || OT || Deguire || The Rink at American Dream || 8–13–2 || 23 || 
|- style="background:#cfc;"
| 24 || March 5 || @ Metropolitan Riveters || 3–4 ||  || Deschênes || The Rink at American Dream || 8–14–2 || 23 || 

|- style="text-align:center;"
| 

|}

Statistics
.

Skaters

Goaltenders

Roster

Coaching staff and team personnel
 Head coach: Peter Smith
 Associate coach: Pierre Alain
 Assistant coach: Katia Clement-Heydra

Awards and honors

Player of the Week
 Awarded November 28: Jade Downie-Landry - First Star, Ann-Sophie Bettez Third Star

Transactions
July 25, 2022: The franchise signed their first seven players, headlined by Ann-Sophie Bettez.
October 12, 2022: The franchise added another five free agents to their roster.

Signings

References

Recaps

External links
 

2022–23 in Canadian ice hockey by team
2020s in Montreal
Montreal Force
2022–23 PHF season
2022–23 PHF season by team